The Al Araba 1 is a sports luxury car created by a joint venture between Saudi Arabian automobile maker Al-Araba Company (officially a vehicle armoring company) and Indian vehicle customising and modification company DC Design . This car was the first Saudi Arabian made civilian vehicle. The project was completed in 2003 and was shown at the Geneva Motor Show. It was built by Fouzi Ayoub Sabri and Dilip Chhabria who based their project on the Mitsubishi Lancer. Few cars were made to keep its rarity and pricing at US$270,000.

Notes and references

External links

Sports cars
Luxury vehicles
All-wheel-drive vehicles
Coupés
Cars introduced in 2003